Pseudopostega lobata is a moth of the family Opostegidae. It was described by Donald R. Davis and Jonas R. Stonis, 2007. It is probably a common, widespread neotropical species, now reported in Central America from Belize to Costa Rica, with two records from northern Argentina.

The length of the forewings is 2–2.4 mm. In Central America, adults have been recorded over much of the year from January to August and October, with only November reported for Argentina.

Etymology
The species name is derived from the Latin lobus (meaning a rounded projection or protuberance) in reference to the broadly rounded, median basal lobe of the male gnathos.

References

Opostegidae
Moths described in 2007